Bertram is both a Germanic given name and a surname, from berht ("bright") and hramn ("raven"). Notable people with the name include:

Given name:
Bertram (Archdeacon of Armagh) (fl. 13th century), Irish Roman Catholic cleric, Archdeacon of Armagh from 1256 to at least 1261
Master Bertram, or Bertram of Minden (c. 1340–1414/1415), German Gothic painter
Bertram Benedict (c. 1892 - 1978), American author and editor
Bertram Clements (1913-2000), English footballer
Bertram Cunningham (1871-1944), British Anglican priest and academic
Bertram Forer (1914–2000), American psychologist
Bert Freeman (Bertram Clewley Freeman, 1885–1955), English footballer
Bertram Goode (born 1886), English footballer
C. Bertram Hartman (1882-1960), American landscape painter
Bertram Heyn (1912-1998), 6th Commander of the Sri Lanka Army
Bertram Ramsay (1883-1945), British Royal Navy commander, one of the principal commanders of Dunkirk evacuation, Channel Dash, Operation Overlord and Normandy landings
Bertram de Shotts (1467-1505), Highwayman and Giant
Bertram Stevens (politician) (1889–1973), Premier of the Australian state of New South Wales between 1932 and 1939
Bertram, Ian (Standard man)  2 legged upright walking creature patrolling the suburb of Wantirna. Feeds mostly on bread gathered from the local Brumbys shop.
Bertram Türpe (born 1952), German Olympic swimmer
Bertram Wallis (1874-1952), English actor and singer

Surname:
Adolf Bertram (1859–1945), Archbishop of Breslau and a cardinal of the Roman Catholic Church
Alexander Charles Bertram (1852—1908), Canadian businessman and journalist
Charles Bertram (1723–1765), English literary impostor and forger
Elsie Bertram (1912–2003), English bookseller
Ernest Bertram, English footballer
George Bertram (disambiguation), several people
Hans Bertram (1906-1993), German aviation pioneer
Helen Bertram (1865-1953), American actress and singer
Horst Bertram (born 1948), German footballer
John Bertram (disambiguation), several people
Julia Bertram (born 1989), 2012/13 German Wine Queen
Laura Bertram (born 1978), Canadian actress
Ossie Bertram (1909-1983), Australian rules footballer
Ron Bertram (1924–2014), Australian politician
Sören Bertram (born 1991), German footballer
Tom Bertram (born 1977), English field hockey player
Tom Bertram (footballer) (born 1987), German footballer
Ute Bertram (born 1961), German politician

Fictional characters:
Bertram (Family Guy), a character on the TV series Family Guy
Bertram (Fire Emblem), a  character in Fire Emblem: Path of Radiance
Bertram Wilberforce Wooster (Bertie Wooster), a character from the Jeeves series by P. G. Wodehouse
Bertram, a character from Havelok the Dane
Bertram, Count of Rousillon, a character from All's Well That Ends Well
Bertram "Bert" Cooper, a character on Mad Men
Bertram, a character from the Disney Channel series Jessie
Bertram, Sir Thomas and Lady, characters in Jane Austen's novel Mansfield Park
Bertram, Godfrey, a character from Walter Scott's novel Guy Mannering
Bertram Baxter, a character from Sue Townsend's series Adrian Mole
Dr. Bertram "Bertie" Chickering Jr., a character on The Knick
Gale Bertram, from the TV series The Mentalist
Bertram Grover Weeks, a character from The Sandlot 
Bertram Gilfoyle, a character from Silicon Valley
Bertram, a character from Thomas and Friends
Bertram Lupov, a character from Isaac Asimov's short story The Last Question

See also
A. Bertram Chandler (1912–1984), science fiction author

English masculine given names
German masculine given names